Romeghan (also Romanized as Romeghān; also known as Rāngūn, Romeqān, and Romqān) is a village in Kuh Mareh Sorkhi Rural District, Arzhan District, Shiraz County, Fars Province, Iran. At the 2006 census, its population was 838, in 193 families.

References 

Populated places in Shiraz County